Lars Troels Jørgensen (born 3 February 1978) is a Danish retired handball player. He used to play for the Danish national team and the Spanish club SDC San Antonio. Lastly he played for the Danish club KIF Kolding København.

He is European Champion by winning the 2008 European Men's Handball Championship with the Danish national handball team.

References

External links
Official homepage

1978 births
Living people
Danish male handball players
Olympic handball players of Denmark
Handball players at the 2008 Summer Olympics
SDC San Antonio players
People from Næstved
Sportspeople from Region Zealand